The Arizona Sting were a lacrosse team based in Phoenix, Arizona playing in the National Lacrosse League (NLL). The 2006 season was the 6th in franchise history and 3rd in Arizona.

After making it to the Championship game in 2005, the Sting had a disappointing 8-8 season in 2006. The Sting upset the division-winning Portland LumberJax 14-10 in the Western Division semifinals, but the eventual champion Colorado Mammoth defeated the Sting 13-12 in Colorado in the Division finals.

Regular season

Conference standings

Game log
Reference:

Playoffs

Game log
Reference:

Player stats
Reference:

Runners (Top 10)

Note: GP = Games played; G = Goals; A = Assists; Pts = Points; LB = Loose Balls; PIM = Penalty minutes

Goaltenders
Note: GP = Games played; MIN = Minutes; W = Wins; L = Losses; GA = Goals against; Sv% = Save percentage; GAA = Goals against average

Awards

Transactions

Trades

Roster
Reference:

See also
2006 NLL season

References

Arizona